, there were 200,000 electric vehicles in Spain. , 6.8% of new cars registered in Spain were battery electric, and 7.4% were plug-in hybrid.

Government policy
, the Spanish government offers tax subsidies of €5,000 for electric vehicle purchases (€7,000 if the buyer turns in a gasoline-powered car).

Charging stations
, there were 13,411 public charging station ports in Spain. , there were 124 public DC charging stations in Spain.

Public opinion
In a 2022 poll conducted by Roland Berger, 63% of respondents said that they intend to purchase an electric car for their next vehicle purchase.

Manufacturing
, around 9,300 electric vehicles were being manufactured per month in Spain.

By autonomous community

Asturias
, there were four public DC charging stations in Asturias.

Canary Islands
, there were 34 public charging stations on Gran Canaria.

Extremadura
, there were no public DC charging stations in Extremadura.

References

Spain
Road transport in Spain